Magnoliidae is a subclass of Equisetopsida in the sense used by Mark W. Chase and James L. Reveal in their 2009 article "A phylogenetic classification of the land plants to accompany APG III." This subclass comprises the angiosperms or flowering plants.

Phylogeny
The following diagram shows a likely phylogenic relationship between subclass Magnoliidae and the other Equisetopsida subclasses.

Superorders
Reveal and Chase, 2011, divide the Magnoliidae subclass into the following superorders:

Amborellanae 
Nymphaeanae 
Austrobaileyanae 
Magnolianae 
Lilianae 
Ceratophyllanae 
Ranunculanae 
Proteanae 
Trochodendranae 
Buxanae 
Myrothamnanae 
Dillenianae 
Saxifraganae 
Rosanae 
Berberidopsidanae 
Santalanae 
Caryophyllanae 
Asteranae 

The following diagram shows a likely phylogenic relationship between the Magnoliidae superorders.

Orders
The Magnoliidae subclass contains the following orders, listed by superorder:

References

Equisetopsida sensu lato
Plant subclasses